Zosteriform speckled lentiginous nevus is a skin lesion that may be the result of a potentially lethal mutation.

The terminology has been described as "confusing".

It was characterized in 1981.

Cutaneous findings in FACES syndrome include zosteriform speckled lentiginous nevi.

See also 
 McCune–Albright syndrome
 List of cutaneous conditions
 Nevus spilus

References 

Epidermal nevi, neoplasms, and cysts